Nicholas Alexander Barnett (born May 27, 1981) is a former American football linebacker.  He played college football for Oregon State University, and was drafted by the Green Bay Packers in the first round of the 2003 NFL Draft. He has played professionally for the NFL's Green Bay Packers, Buffalo Bills and Washington Redskins. With the Packers, he won Super Bowl XLV against the Pittsburgh Steelers.

Early years 
Barnett was born in Barstow, California and attended Fontana A.B. Miller High School in Fontana, California.

College career 
Barnett attended Oregon State University, where he was a four-year letter winner for the Oregon State Beavers football team (1999–2002), starting the last three seasons at strong side linebacker. As a senior, Barnett was a first-team All-Pacific-10 Conference selection. He led the conference in tackles with 121 (62 solo). Barnett registered his single game best against the University of California in 2001 with 18 tackles (11 solo).

He majored in Business Administration and Communications.

College statistics

Professional career

Green Bay Packers 
The Green Bay Packers selected Barnett in the first round (29th overall) of the 2003 NFL Draft. Barnett was the third linebacker drafted in 2003, behind Terrell Suggs (10th overall) and Calvin Pace (18th overall).

On July 19, 2003, the Green Bay Packers signed Barnett to five-year, $6 million contract that includes a signing bonus of $3.21 million. Barnett entered training camp as the 'de facto' starting middle linebacker, replacing Hardy Nickerson. Head coach Mike Sherman named Barnett the starting middle linebacker to begin his rookie season. He started alongside outside linebackers Hannibal Navies and Na'il Diggs.

He made his professional regular season debut and first career start during the Green Bay Packers' season-opener against the Minnesota Vikings and made five combined tackles (one solo) during their 30–25 loss. On September 14, 2003, Barnett collected a season-high 14 combined tackles (12 solo), deflected one pass, and made his first career interception during a 31–6 victory against the Detroit Lions in Week 2. Barnett intercepted a pass by Lions' quarterback Joey Harrington, that was originally intended for tight end Mikhael Ricks, and returned it for a 13-yard gain during the fourth quarter. In Week 4, he made four combined tackles (three solo) and made his first career sack on Bears' quarterback Kordell Stewart for a five-yard loss during the first quarter of a 38–23 victory at the Chicago Bears. Barnett was inactive for the Packers' Week 13 loss at the Detroit Lions after sustaining an ankle injury during a 20–10 win against the San Francisco 49ers the previous week. He finished his rookie season in 2003 with 112 combined tackle (86 solo), three pass deflections, three interceptions, and two sacks in 15 games and 15 starts.

The Green Bay Packers finished first in the NFC North with a 10-6 record in 2003. On January 4, 2004, Barnett started in his first career playoff game and made six combined tackles (three solo) during a 33-27 overtime victory against the Seattle Seahawks during the NFC Wildcard Game. The following week, he made five solo tackles and defended two passes as the Packers lost 20-17 at the Philadelphia Eagles during the NFC Divisional Round and were eliminated from the playoffs.

On April 10, 2007, Barnett signed a six-year contract extension worth $34.85 million.

Barnett missed the second half of the 2008 season after suffering a torn knee ligament during November 9's game against the Minnesota Vikings.

Barnett suffered a season-ending wrist injury in a Week 4 matchup vs. the Detroit Lions. He was put on injured reserve on October 7, 2010. It was the second time in three seasons that Barnett ended his season on injured reserve. As of 2018 Barnett is third in all-time tackles for the Green Bay Packers.

On July 26, 2011, Barnett was informed by Packers General Manager, Ted Thompson, that the Packers will try to trade him, but if not, they will release him. He was released on July 28, after Green Bay was unable to find a trade.

Buffalo Bills 
Barnett signed a three-year, $12 million deal with the Buffalo Bills on July 31, 2011.  On February 11, 2013 the Bills announced that Barnett would be released from his contract along with safety George Wilson.

Washington Redskins 
On July 31, 2013, Barnett agreed to a one-year deal with the Washington Redskins. He switched from the outside to inside linebacker position for the Redskins' defensive scheme. On December 24, he was placed on injured reserve after suffering a MCL sprain in the Week 16 game against the Dallas Cowboys.

Professional statistics

References

External links 

Washington Redskins bio
Buffalo Bills bio
Oregon State Beavers bio

1981 births
Living people
People from Fontana, California
Players of American football from California
Sportspeople from San Bernardino County, California
American football linebackers
Oregon State Beavers football players
Green Bay Packers players
Buffalo Bills players
Washington Redskins players